Small interfering RNA (siRNA), sometimes known as short interfering RNA or silencing RNA, is a class of double-stranded RNA at first non-coding RNA molecules, typically 20-24 (normally 21) base pairs in length, similar to miRNA, and operating within the RNA interference (RNAi) pathway.  It interferes with the expression of specific genes with complementary nucleotide sequences by degrading mRNA after transcription, preventing translation.

Structure 

Naturally occurring siRNAs have a well-defined structure that is a short (usually 20 to 24-bp) double-stranded RNA (dsRNA) with phosphorylated 5' ends and hydroxylated 3' ends with two overhanging nucleotides.
The Dicer enzyme catalyzes production of siRNAs from long dsRNAs and small hairpin RNAs. siRNAs can also be introduced into cells by transfection. Since in principle any gene can be knocked down by a synthetic siRNA with a complementary sequence, siRNAs are an important tool for validating gene function and drug targeting in the post-genomic era.

History
In 1998, Andrew Fire at Carnegie Institution for Science in Washington DC and Craig Mello at University of Massachusetts in Worcester discovered the RNAi mechanism while working on the gene expression in the nematode, Caenorhabditis elegans. They won the Nobel prize for their research with RNAi in 2006. siRNAs and their role in post-transcriptional gene silencing(PTGS) was discovered in plants by David Baulcombe's group at the Sainsbury Laboratory in Norwich, England and reported in Science in 1999. Thomas Tuschl and colleagues soon reported in Nature that synthetic siRNAs could induce RNAi in mammalian cells. In 2001, the expression of a specific gene was successfully silenced by introducing chemically synthesized siRNA into mammalian cells (Tuschl et al.) These discoveries led to a surge in interest in harnessing RNAi for biomedical research and drug development. Significant developments in siRNA therapies have been made with both organic (carbon based) and inorganic (non-carbon based) nanoparticles, which have been successful in drug delivery to the brain, offering promising methods to deliver therapeutics into human subjects. However, human applications of siRNA have had significant limitations to its success. One of these being off-targeting. There is also a possibility that these therapies can trigger innate immunity. Animal models have not been successful in accurately representing the extent of this response in humans. Hence, studying the effects of siRNA therapies has been a challenge.  

In recent years, siRNA therapies have been approved and new methods have been established to overcome these challenges. There are approved therapies available for commercial use and several currently in the pipeline waiting to get approval.

Mechanism 
The mechanism by which natural siRNA causes gene silencing through repression of translation occurs as follows:

 Long dsRNA (which can come from hairpin, complementary RNAs, and RNA-dependent RNA polymerases) is cleaved by an endo-ribonuclease called Dicer. Dicer cuts the long dsRNA to form short interfering RNA or siRNA; this is what enables the molecules to form the RNA-Induced Silencing Complex (RISC).
 Once siRNA enters the cell it gets incorporated into other proteins to form the RISC.
 Once the siRNA is part of the RISC complex, the siRNA is unwound to form single stranded siRNA.
 The strand that is thermodynamically less stable due to its base pairing at the 5´end is chosen to remain part of the RISC-complex
 The single stranded siRNA which is part of the RISC complex now can scan and find a complementary mRNA
 Once the single stranded siRNA (part of the RISC complex) binds to its target mRNA, it induces mRNA cleavage.
 The mRNA is now cut and recognized as abnormal by the cell. This causes degradation of the mRNA and in turn no translation of the mRNA into amino acids and then proteins. Thus silencing the gene that encodes that mRNA.
siRNA is also similar to miRNA, however, miRNAs are derived from shorter stemloop RNA products. miRNAs typically silence genes by repression of translation and have broader specificity of action, while siRNAs typically work with higher specificity by cleaving the mRNA before translation, with 100% complementarity.

RNAi induction using siRNAs or their biosynthetic precursors

Gene knockdown by transfection of exogenous siRNA is often unsatisfactory because the effect is only transient, especially in rapidly dividing cells. This may be overcome by creating an expression vector for the siRNA. The siRNA sequence is modified to introduce a short loop between the two strands. The resulting transcript is a short hairpin RNA (shRNA), which can be processed into a functional siRNA by Dicer in its usual fashion. Typical transcription cassettes use an RNA polymerase III promoter (e.g., U6 or H1) to direct the transcription of small nuclear RNAs (snRNAs) (U6 is involved in RNA splicing; H1 is the RNase component of human RNase P). It is theorized that the resulting siRNA transcript is then processed by Dicer.

The gene knockdown efficiency can also be improved by using cell squeezing.
 
The activity of siRNAs in RNAi is largely dependent on its binding ability to the RNA-induced silencing complex (RISC). Binding of the duplex siRNA to RISC is followed by unwinding and cleavage of the sense strand with endonucleases. The remaining anti-sense strand-RISC complex can then bind to target mRNAs for initiating transcriptional silencing.

RNA activation
It has been found that dsRNA can also activate gene expression, a mechanism that has been termed "small RNA-induced gene activation" or RNAa. It has been shown that dsRNAs targeting gene promoters induce potent transcriptional activation of associated genes. RNAa was demonstrated in human cells using synthetic dsRNAs, termed "small activating RNAs" (saRNAs). It is currently not known how conserved RNAa is in other organisms. One report in the Aedes aegypti mosquito has shown there is some evidence for RNAa and can be achieved by short or long dsRNAs targeting promoter regions.

Post-transcriptional gene silencing 
The siRNA-induced post transcriptional gene silencing is initiated by the assembly of the RNA-induced silencing complex (RISC). The complex silences certain gene expression by cleaving the mRNA molecules coding the target genes. To begin the process, one of the two siRNA strands, the guide strand (anti-sense strand), will be loaded into the RISC while the other strand, the passenger strand (sense strand), is degraded. Certain Dicer enzymes may be responsible for loading the guide strand into RISC. Then, the siRNA scans for and directs RISC to perfectly complementary sequence on the mRNA molecules. The cleavage of the mRNA molecules is thought to be catalyzed by the Piwi domain of Argonaute proteins of the RISC. The mRNA molecule is then cut precisely by cleaving the phosphodiester bond between the target nucleotides which are paired to siRNA residues 10 and 11, counting from the 5'end. This cleavage results in mRNA fragments that are further degraded by cellular exonucleases. The 5' fragment is degraded from its 3' end by exosome while the 3' fragment is degraded from its 5' end by 5' -3' exoribonuclease 1(XRN1). Dissociation of the target mRNA strand from RISC after the cleavage allow more mRNA to be silenced. This dissociation process is likely to be promoted by extrinsic factors driven by ATP hydrolysis.

Sometimes cleavage of the target mRNA molecule does not occur. In some cases, the endonucleolytic cleavage of the phosphodiester backbone may be suppressed by mismatches of siRNA and target mRNA near the cleaving site. Other times, the Argonaute proteins of the RISC lack endonuclease activity even when the target mRNA and siRNA are perfectly paired. In such cases, gene expression will be silenced by an miRNA induced mechanism instead 

Piwi-interacting RNAs are responsible for the silencing of transposons and are not siRNAs. PIWI-interacting RNAs (piRNAs) are a recently-discovered class of small non-coding RNAs (ncRNAs) with a length of 21-35 nucleotides. They play a role in gene expression regulation, transposon silencing, and viral infection inhibition. Once considered as “dark matter” of ncRNAs, piRNAs emerged as important players in multiple cellular functions in different organisms.

Transcriptional Gene Silencing 
Many model organism, such as plants (Arabidopsis thaliana), yeast (Saccharomyces cerevisiae  ), flies (Drosophila melanogaster) and worms (C. elegans), have been used to study small non coding RNA-directed Transcriptional gene silencing. In human cell, RNA-directed transcriptional gene silencing was observed a decade ago when exogenous siRNAs silenced a transgenic elongation factor 1 α promoter driving a Green Fluorescent Protein (GFP) reporter gene.
The main mechanisms of transcriptional gene silencing (TGS) involving the RNAi machinery include DNA methylation, histone post-translational modifications, and subsequent chromatin remodeling around the target gene into a heterochromatic state.
SiRNAs can be incorporated into a RNA-induced transcriptional silencing (RITS) complex. An active RITS complex will trigger the formation of heterochromatin around DNA matching the siRNA, effectively silencing the genes in that region of the DNA.

Applications: Allele-specific gene silencing
One of the potent applications of siRNAs is the ability to distinguish the target versus non-target sequence with a single-nucleotide difference. This approach has been considered as therapeutically crucial for the silencing dominant gain-of-function (GOF) disorders,where mutant allele causing disease is differed from wt-allele by a single nucleotide (nt). These types of siRNAs with the capability to distinguish a single-nt difference, are termed as, allele-specific siRNAs.

ASP-RNAi is an innovative category of RNAi with the objective of suppressing the dominant mutant allele while sparing expression of the corresponding normal allele with the specificity of single-nucleotide differences between the two. ASP-siRNAs are potentially a novel and better remedial alternative for the treatment of autosomal dominant genetic disorders especially in cases where wild-type allele expression is crucial for organism survival such as Huntington disease (HD),DYT1 dystonia (Gonzalez-Alegre et al. 2003, 2005), Alzheimer’s disease (Sierant et al. 2011), Parkinson’s disease (PD) (Takahashi et al. 2015), amyloid lateral sclerosis (ALS) (Schwarz et al. 2006), and Machado–Joseph disease (Alves et al. 2008). Their therapeutic potential has also been assessed for various skin disorders like epidermolysis bullosa simplex (Atkinson et al. 2011), epidermolytic palmoplantar keratoderma (EPPK) (Lyu et al. 2016), and lattice corneal dystrophy type I (LCDI) (Courtney et al. 2014).

Challenges: avoiding nonspecific effects
RNAi intersects with a number of other pathways; it is not surprising that on occasion, nonspecific effects are triggered by the experimental introduction of an siRNA. When a mammalian cell encounters a double-stranded RNA such as an siRNA, it may mistake it as a viral by-product and mount an immune response.  Furthermore, because structurally related microRNAs modulate gene expression largely via incomplete complementarity base pair interactions with a target mRNA, the introduction of an siRNA may cause unintended off-targeting. Chemical modifications of siRNA may alter the thermodynamic properties that also result in a loss of single nucleotide specificity.

Innate immunity
Introduction of too many siRNA can result in nonspecific events due to activation of innate immune responses. Most evidence to date suggests that this is probably due to activation of the dsRNA sensor PKR, although retinoic acid-inducible gene I (RIG-I) may also be involved. The induction of cytokines via toll-like receptor 7 (TLR7) has also been described. Chemical modification of siRNA is employed to reduce in the activation of the innate immune response for gene function and therapeutic applications.  One promising method of reducing the nonspecific effects is to convert the siRNA into a microRNA. MicroRNAs occur naturally, and by harnessing this endogenous pathway it should be possible to achieve similar gene knockdown at comparatively low concentrations of resulting siRNAs. This should minimize nonspecific effects.

Off-targeting 
Off-targeting is another challenge to the use of siRNAs as a gene knockdown tool. Here, genes with incomplete complementarity are inadvertently downregulated by the siRNA (in effect, the siRNA acts as a miRNA), leading to problems in data interpretation and potential toxicity. This, however, can be partly addressed by designing appropriate control experiments, and siRNA design algorithms are currently being developed to produce siRNAs free from off-targeting. Genome-wide expression analysis, e.g., by microarray technology, can then be used to verify this and further refine the algorithms. A 2006 paper from the laboratory of Dr. Khvorova implicates 6- or 7-basepair-long stretches from position 2 onward in the siRNA matching with 3'UTR regions in off-targeted genes. The tool of siRNA off-target predition is available at http://crdd.osdd.net/servers/aspsirna/asptar.php and published as ASPsiRNA resource.

Adaptive immune responses 
Plain RNAs may be poor immunogens, but antibodies can easily be created against RNA-protein complexes. Many autoimmune diseases see these types of antibodies. There haven't yet been reports of antibodies against siRNA bound to proteins. Some methods for siRNA delivery adjoin polyethylene glycol (PEG) to the oligonucleotide reducing excretion and improving circulating half-life. However recently a large Phase III trial of PEGylated RNA aptamer against factor IX had to be discontinued by Regado Biosciences because of a severe anaphylactic reaction to the PEG part of the RNA. This reaction led to death in some cases and raises significant concerns about siRNA delivery when PEGylated oligonucleotides are involved.

Saturation of the RNAi machinery 
siRNAs transfection into cells typically lowers the expression of many genes, however, the upregulation of genes is also observed. The upregulation of gene expression can partially be explained by the predicted gene targets of endogenous miRNAs. Computational analyses of more than 150 siRNA transfection experiments support a model where exogenous siRNAs can saturate the endogenous RNAi machinery, resulting in the de-repression of endogenous miRNA-regulated genes. Thus, while siRNAs can produce unwanted off-target effects, i.e. unintended downregulation of mRNAs via a partial sequence match between the siRNA and target, the saturation of RNAi machinery is another distinct nonspecific effect, which involves the de-repression of miRNA-regulated genes and results in similar problems in data interpretation and potential toxicity.

Chemical modification 

siRNAs have been chemically modified to enhance their therapeutic properties, Short interfering RNA (siRNA) must be delivered to the site of action in the cells of target tissues in order for RNAi to fulfill its therapeutic promise. A detailed database of all such chemical modifications is manually curated as siRNAmod in scientific literature. Chemical modification of siRNA can also inadvertently result in loss of single-nucleotide specificity.

Therapeutic applications and challenges
Given the ability to knock down, in essence, any gene of interest, RNAi via siRNAs has generated a great deal of interest in both basic and applied biology.

One of the biggest challenges to siRNA and RNAi based therapeutics is intracellular delivery. siRNA also has weak stability and pharmacokinetic behavior. Delivery of siRNA via nanoparticles has shown promise. siRNA oligos in vivo are vulnerable to degradation by plasma and tissue  endonucleases and exonucleases and have shown only mild effectiveness in localized delivery sites, such as the human eye. Delivering pure DNA to target organisms is challenging because its large size and structure prevents it from diffusing readily across membranes. siRNA oligos circumvent this problem due to their small size of 21-23 oligos. This allows delivery via nano-scale delivery vehicles called nanovectors.

A good nanovector for siRNA delivery should protect siRNA from degradation, enrich siRNA in the target organ and facilitate the cellular uptake of siRNA. The three main groups of siRNA nanovectors are: lipid based, non-lipid organic-based, and inorganic. Lipid based nanovectors are excellent for delivering siRNA to solid tumors, but other cancers may require different non-lipid based organic nanovectors such as cyclodextrin based nanoparticles.

siRNAs delivered via lipid based nanoparticles have been shown to have therapeutic potential for central nervous system (CNS) disorders. Central nervous disorders are not uncommon, but the blood brain barrier (BBB) often blocks access of potential therapeutics to the brain. siRNAs that target and silence efflux proteins on the BBB surface have been shown to create an increase in BBB permeability. siRNA delivered via lipid based nanoparticles is able to cross the BBB completely.

A huge difficulty in siRNA delivery is the problem of off-targeting. Since genes are read in both directions, there exists a possibility that even if the intended antisense siRNA strand is read and knocks out the target mRNA, the sense siRNA strand may target another protein involved in another function.

Phase I results of the first two therapeutic RNAi trials (indicated for age-related macular degeneration, aka AMD) reported at the end of 2005 that siRNAs are well tolerated and have suitable pharmacokinetic properties.

In a phase 1 clinical trial, 41 patients with advanced cancer metastasised to liver were administered RNAi delivered through lipid nanoparticles. The RNAi targeted two genes encoding key proteins in the growth of the cancer cells, vascular endothelial growth factor, (VEGF), and kinesin spindle protein (KSP).  The results showed clinical benefits, with the cancer either stabilized after six months, or regression of metastasis in some of the patients.  Pharmacodynamic analysis of biopsy samples from the patients revealed the presence of the RNAi constructs in the samples, proving that the molecules reached the intended target.

Proof of concept trials have indicated that Ebola-targeted siRNAs may be effective as post-exposure prophylaxis in humans, with 100% of non-human primates surviving a lethal dose of Zaire Ebolavirus, the most lethal strain.

Legal categorization and legal issues in a near future 
Currently, SiRNA are currently chemically synthesized and so, are legally categorized inside EU and in USA as simple medicinal products. But as bioengineered siRNA (BERAs) are in development, these would be classified as biological medicinal products, at least in EU. The development of the BERAs technology raises the question of the categorization of drugs having the same mechanism of action but being produced chemically or biologically. This lack of consistency should be addressed.

Intracellular delivery 

There is great potential for RNA interference (RNAi) to be used therapeutically to reversibly silence any gene. For RNAi to realize its therapeutic potential, small interfering RNA (siRNA) must be delivered to the site of action in the cells of target tissues. But finding safe and efficient delivery mechanisms is a major obstacle to achieving the full potential of siRNA-based therapies.  Unmodified siRNA is unstable in the bloodstream, has the potential to cause immunogenicity, and has difficulty readily navigating cell membranes. As a result, chemical alterations and/or delivery tools are needed to safely transfer siRNA to its site of action.
There are three main techniques of delivery for siRNA that differ on efficiency and toxicity.

Transfection 
In this technique siRNA first must be designed against the target gene. Once the siRNA is configured against the gene it has to be effectively delivered through a transfection protocol. Delivery is usually done by cationic liposomes, polymer nanoparticles, and lipid conjugation. This method is advantageous because it can deliver siRNA to most types of cells, has high efficiency and reproducibility, and is offered commercially. The most common commercial reagents for transfection of siRNA are Lipofectamine and Neon Transfection. However, it is not compatible with all cell types and has low in vivo efficiency.

Electroporation 

Electrical pulses are also used to intracellularly deliver siRNA into cells. The cell membrane is made of phospholipids which makes it susceptible to an electric field. When quick but powerful electrical pulses are initiated the lipid molecules reorient themselves, while undergoing thermal phase transitions because of heating. This results in the making of hydrophilic pores and localized perturbations in the lipid bilayer cell membrane also causing a temporary loss of semipermeability. This allows for the escape of many intracellular contents, such as ions and metabolites as well as the simultaneous uptake of drugs, molecular probes, and nucleic acids. For cells that are difficult to transfect electroporation is advantageous however cell death is more probable under this technique.

This method has been used to deliver siRNA targeting VEGF into the xenografted tumors in nude mice, which resulted in a significant suppression of tumor growth.

Viral-mediated delivery 
The gene silencing effects of transfected designed siRNA are generally transient, but this difficulty can be overcome through an RNAi approach. Delivering this siRNA from DNA templates can be done through several recombinant viral vectors based on retrovirus, adeno-associated virus, adenovirus, and lentivirus. The latter is the most efficient virus that stably delivers siRNA to target cells as it can transduce nondividing cells as well as directly target the nucleus. These specific viral vectors have been synthesized to effectively facilitate siRNA that is not viable for transfection into cells. Another aspect is that in some cases synthetic viral vectors can integrate siRNA into the cell genome which allows for stable expression of siRNA and long-term gene knockdown. This technique is advantageous because it is in vivo and effective for difficult to transfect cell. However problems arise because it can trigger antiviral responses in some cell types leading to mutagenic and immunogenic effects.

This method has potential use in gene silencing of the central nervous system for the treatment of Huntington's disease.

Therapies 
A decade after the discovery of RNAi mechanism in 1993, the pharmaceutical sector heavily invested in the research and development of siRNA therapy. There are several advantages that this therapy has over small molecules and antibodies. It can be administered quarterly or every six months. Another advantage is that, unlike small molecule and monoclonal antibodies that need to recognize specific conformation of a protein, siRNA functions by Watson-Crick basepairing with mRNA. Therefore, any target molecule that needs to be treated with high affinity and specificity can be selected if the right nucleotide sequence is available. One of the biggest challenges researchers needed to overcome was the identification and establishment of a delivery system through which the therapies would enter the body. And that the immune system often mistakes the RNAi therapies as remnants of infectious agents, which can trigger an immune response. Animal models did not accurately represent the degree of immune response that was seen in humans and despite the promise in the treatment investors divested away from RNAi.

However, there were a few companies that continued with the development of RNAi therapy for humans. Alnylam Pharmaceuticals, Sirna Therapeutics and Dicerna Pharmaceuticals are few of the companies still working on bringing RNAi therapies to market. It was learned that almost all siRNA therapies administered in the bloodstream accumulated in the liver. That is why most of the early drug targets were diseases that affected the liver. Repeated developmental work also shed light on improving the chemical composition of the RNA molecule to reduce the immune response, subsequently causing little to no side effects. Listed below are some of approved therapies or therapies in pipeline.

Alnylam Pharmaceuticals 
In 2018, Alnylam Pharmaceuticals became the first company to have a siRNA therapy approved by the FDA. Onpattro (patisiran) was approved for the treatment of polyneuropathy of hereditary transthyretin-mediated (hATTR) amyloidosis in adults. hATTR is a rare, progressively debilitating condition. During hATTR amyloidosis, misfolded transthyretin (TTR) protein is deposited in the extracellular space. Under typical folding conditions, TTR tetramers are made up of four monomers. Hereditary ATTR amyloidosis is caused by a fault or mutation in the transthyretin (TTR) gene which is inherited. Changing just one amino-acid changes the tetrameric transthyretin proteins, resulting in unstable tetrameric transthyretin protein that aggregates in monomers and forms insoluble extracellular amyloid deposits. Amyloid buildup in various organ systems causes cardiomyopathy, polyneuropathy, gastrointestinal dysfunction. It affects 50,000 people worldwide. To deliver the drug directly to the liver, siRNA is encased in a lipid nanoparticle. The siRNA molecule halts the production of amyloid proteins by interfering with the RNA production of abnormal TTR proteins. This prevents the accumulation of these proteins in different organs of the body and helps the patients manage this disease.

Traditionally, liver transplantation has been the standard treatment for hereditary transthyretin amyloidosis, however its effectiveness may be limited by the persistent deposition of wild-type transthyretin amyloid after transplantation. There are also small molecule medications that provide temporary relief. Before Onpattro was released, the treatment options for hATTR were limited. After the approval of Onpattro, FDA awarded Alnylam with the Breakthrough Therapy Designation, which is given to drugs that are intended to treat a serious condition and are a substantial improvement over any available therapy. It was also awarded Orphan Drug Designations given to those treatments that are intended to safely treat conditions affecting less than 200,000 people.

Along with Onpattro, another RNA interference therapeutic drug has also been discovered (Partisiran) which has property of inhibiting hepatic synthesis of transthyretin. Target messenger RNA (mRNA) is cleaved as a result by tiny interfering RNAs coupled to the RNA-induced silencing complex. Patisiran, an investigational RNAi therapeutic drug, uses this process to decrease the production of mutant and wild-type transthyretin by cleaving on 3-untranslated region of transthyretin mRNA.

In 2019, FDA approved the second RNAi therapy, Givlaari (givosiran) used to treat acute hepatic porphyria (AHP). The disease is caused due to the accumulation of toxic porphobilinogen (PBG) molecules which are formed during the production of heme. These molecules accumulate in different organs and this can lead to the symptoms or attacks of AHP.

Givlaari is an siRNA drug that downregulates the expression of aminolevulinic acid synthase 1 (ALAS1), a liver enzyme involved in an early step in heme production. The downregulation of ALAS1 lowers the levels of neurotoxic intermediates that cause AHP symptoms.

Years of research has led to a greater understanding of siRNA therapies beyond those affecting the liver. Alnylam Pharmaceuticals is currently involved in therapies that may treat amyloidosis and CNS disorders like Huntington's disease and Alzheimer's disease. They have also recently partnered with Regeneron Pharmaceuticals to develop therapies for CNS, eye and liver diseases.

As of 2020, ONPATTRO and GIVLAARI, are available for commercial application, and two siRNAs, lumasiran (ALN-GO1) and inclisiran, have been submitted for new drug application to the FDA. Several siRNAs are undergoing phase 3 clinical studies, and more candidates are in the early developmental stage. In 2020, Alnylam and Vir pharmaceuticals announced a partnership and have started working on a RNAi therapy that would treat severe cases of COVID-19.

Other companies that have had success in developing a pipeline of siRNA therapies are Dicerna Pharmaceuticals, partnered with Eli Lily and Arrowhead Pharmaceuticals partnered with Johnson and Johnson. Several other big pharmaceutical companies such as Amgen and AstraZeneca have also invested heavily in siRNA therapies as they see the potential success of this area of biological drugs.

See also 
 Gene knockdown
 Gene silencing
 Oligonucleotide synthesis
 EsiRNA
 NatsiRNA
 Viroid
 VIRsiRNAdb
 CRISPR
 Dharmacon
 Persomics

References

Further reading

External links 

RNA
RNA interference
Molecular biology
Non-coding RNA